I'm In Love Again is the sixth studio album by American singer Patti LaBelle in 1983. It was released by Philadelphia International Records and Sony Music Entertainment on November 25, 1983, in the United States. LaBelle's commercial breakthrough, it featured her first top ten R&B hits, "Love, Need and Want You" and "If Only You Knew", the latter topping the R&B chart in early 1984. It was later certified gold for selling half a million copies and paved the way for her pop breakthrough in late 1984 with the dance hit "New Attitude".

History
In 1977, Patti LaBelle began her solo career after sixteen years with the group Labelle. While her debut album, released on Epic, proved successful, her three follow-ups failed to generate similar success. In 1981, when her Epic contract expired, she signed with Philadelphia International Records, and released the album, The Spirit's in It, which produced some success and convinced the label to come up with a follow-up. LaBelle began recording her second PIR album in 1982 at the famed Sigma Sound Studios in Philadelphia with producers Kenny Gamble, Leon Huff and Dexter Wansel.

Gamble & Huff, in executive producing charge of LaBelle's recording, searched to find songs that could give the powerhouse soul singer a charted smash hit, noting that the singer hadn't had a major hit since the release of her 1974 classic, "Lady Marmalade". Of her twelve solo single releases, only "I Don't Go Shopping", "It's a Joy to Have Your Love" and "It's Alright with Me" charted above the top 40 on the R&B charts, with "I Don't Go Shopping" becoming a top 30 hit. At around the same time, LaBelle kept herself busy by participating in Broadway plays and various musical theatre productions, including Your Arms Too Short to Box with God, For Colored Girls Who Have Considered Suicide When the Rainbow Is Enuf and Working, as well as filming her role on the film, A Soldier's Story, which halted the second album's production. That same year, LaBelle had undergone plastic surgery treatment on her nose, to which she claimed, was only to "sing higher notes". Only did the singer later admitted that she had the surgery for "vanity" reasons and while she said she loved the new nose, regretted having it done.

Recording
Recording of the album took place in various dates in 1982 and 1983. Due to LaBelle's non-studio engagements, the album's release was often delayed. The 1982 recordings were mid-tempo love songs with focus on live instrumentation and strings, including "I'm in Love Again", "Love, Need & Want You" and "If Only You Knew", the latter featuring only sparse synthesizer and keyboard work to complement the live sound. During 1982 sessions, LaBelle also recorded the ballad "Hero", which later became a charted hit for Gladys Knight & The Pips in 1983. LaBelle's version was never included on the album. The last song recorded in the 1982 sessions was the country soul ballad "Love Bankrupt", written by Cecil and Linda Womack of Womack & Womack. After a break from working on A Soldier's Story, LaBelle went back to finish the album in 1983 sessions, producing the dance song "I'll Never, Never Give Up". Composed by Leon Huff, the song's focus on synthesizers would result in LaBelle later recording "New Attitude", which was also heavy on synthesizers. She also recorded a cover of the standard jazz song, "Lover Man (Oh, Where Can You Be?)" and a mid-tempo light funk groove, "When Am I Gonna Find True Love". In addition to these songs, Gamble & Huff overdubbed a song left off from The Spirit's in It, a light funk song titled "Body Language".

Reception

I'm In Love Again was released in November 1983. The album received critical and commercial success after the album became LaBelle's first to chart the top 40 of the Billboard 200, peaking at number-forty and reaching number-four on the R&B albums chart, her highest to date at the time. With sales of over 500,000 copies, I'm in Love Again was certified gold by the Recording Industry Association of America by the end of 1984.

The album launched two singles - "If Only You Knew" and "Love, Need and Want You". The former track reached number-one on the R&B singles chart - LaBelle's first to do so, while also reaching the lower regions of the top 50 on the Billboard Hot 100 peaking at a respective number 46. "Love, Need and Want You" peaked at number ten on the R&B singles chart though it never crossed over to pop charts. "I'll Never, Never Give Up" was only a minor hit on the dance charts.

Track listing

Charts

Certifications

References

Album chart usages for Billboard200
Album chart usages for BillboardRandBHipHop
Patti LaBelle albums
1983 albums
Philadelphia International Records albums
Albums produced by Kenneth Gamble
Albums produced by Leon Huff
Albums recorded at Sigma Sound Studios